Listrocerum asperipenne is a species of beetle in the family Cerambycidae. It was described by Stephan von Breuning in 1957. It is known from Somalia.

References

Endemic fauna of Somalia
Dorcaschematini
Beetles described in 1957